Mount Clare is a village in Macoupin County, Illinois, United States. Its population was 311 at the 2020 census.

Geography
Mount Clare is located in southeastern Macoupin County at  (39.099811, -89.821915). Illinois Route 4 runs north-south through the east side of the village, while Illinois Route 138 leads southwest  to Wilsonville.

The village is drained by the headwaters of Big Branch, a south-flowing tributary of Cahokia Creek, which runs to the Mississippi River northeast of St. Louis.

Demographics

As of the census of 2000, there were 433 people, 135 households, and 91 families residing in the village. The racial makeup of the village was 97.46% White, 0.92% African American, 0.46% Native American, and 1.15% from two or more races. Hispanic or Latino of any race were 0.23% of the population.

There were 135 households, out of which 27.4% had children under the age of 18 living with them, 46.7% were married couples living together, 17.0% had a female householder with no husband present, and 31.9% were non-families. 28.1% of all households were made up of individuals, and 18.5% had someone living alone who was 65 years of age or older. The average household size was 2.39 and the average family size was 2.95.

In the village, the population was spread out, with 18.2% under the age of 18, 6.0% from 18 to 24, 17.1% from 25 to 44, 17.1% from 45 to 64, and 41.6% who were 65 years of age or older. The median age was 53 years. For every 100 females, there were 61.6 males. For every 100 females age 18 and over, there were 55.9 males.

The median income for a household in the village was $37,000, and the median income for a family was $39,250. Males had a median income of $26,875 versus $27,188 for females. The per capita income for the village was $13,451. About 3.2% of families and 6.0% of the population were below the poverty line, including 7.9% of those under age 18 and 9.5% of those age 65 or over.

References

Villages in Macoupin County, Illinois
Villages in Illinois